Vladislav Kurasov (born 13 March 1995) is a singer, songwriter, the finalist of the Ukrainian version of the television show The X-Factor, the winner of the television show Star Ring, The People's Voice Winner at the 2013 International Songwriting Competition, winner of the 2014 Unsigned Only Music Competition Fandemonium. He became a semifinalist in the Ukrainian National Selection for Eurovision Song Contest 2016, with "I'm Insane"

Early years

Kurasov was born on 13 March 1995 in Brest, Belarus. He has two sisters and a brother and is the youngest in the family. In 2006, the Kurasov's family moved to Krasnodar, Russia. Vladislav enrolled in the Interschool Aesthetic Center (IAC) to study variety vocal singing and pianoforte, and theatre at the Creative Union "Première". He graduated his studies at these institutions in 2011 with honors.  He is the winner of many national and international competitions, such as: "Blue-Eyed Anapa", "Star Youth of the Planet", "Little Stars", "Eaglet Lights Up a Star" and many others.

In 2007 Kurasov took part in Minuta slavy a show on the Russian "First Channel" performing Elvis Presley's song "Blue Suede Shoes" which received high scores from the jury.

X Factor 

On 27 August 2011 the STB broadcast a program about the Х-Factor auditions in Donetsk where Kurasov performed Celine Dion's song "My Heart Will Go On". The audience rose in applause and all four judges said "Yes" to Kurasov.

Having successfully passed the first three rounds of the selection process (preliminary and TV auditions and the training camp), Kurasov began competing in the fourth and deciding round for a place in the "Boys" category.

On 22 October 2011, in Х-Factor first live broadcast, Kurasov performed Leonard Cohen song "Hallelujah" which eventually became the "visiting card" of the young performer.

In week 7 he landed in the bottom two against Svitlana Vinnik but was saved by majority vote.

In the finale of the project he performed "Walking Away" in a duet with the British star Craig David. Kurasov finished third based on viewers voting.

Star Ring 

On 6 March 2012 the Ukrainian TV channel STB launched the show "Star Ring" which was a contest of finalists of two Х-Factor seasons and vocalists of Ukrayina maye talant. Kurasov was one of the contestants of that new project.

During the live broadcast of "Star Ring" on 10 April 2012, designated as the last broadcast of the show, and winner to be chosen by public voting, Kurasov performed "Hallelujah" from Leonard Cohen, his "visiting card", trying to impart new feelings to the song. Based on viewers’ voting he became was declared the winner and was awarded a cash prize of UAH 500,000 (equivalent to $61,550 USD) in addition to recording the song and releasing a music video.

Music career

Kurasov's first authored song was "Farewell, My Town". It was released online on 22 June 2012 and was favorably received by his fans, getting good reviews.

On 2 December 2012, as a winner of the contest at the "Yatalant.ru", Kurasov presented his song "Proshchay, Moy Gorod" (Farewell, My Town) at "The Golden Gramophone Award" in St Petersburg, Russia. a yearly national Russian music award, established by Russian Radio in 1996 perfprming at the Ice Palace with a capacity of 11,000.

His second single "Nol Liubvi v Kvadrate" ("Zero Love Squared") became a semifinalist of The International Songwriting Competition in 2012 in Nashville, Tennessee in the Teen and Dance categories. Over 20,000 songs entered the competition from over 119 countries in all genres.

On 22 December 2012 Kurasov was an invitational guest at season three of the Ukrainian X Factor performing a new song "Shopot Dozhdey" ("Whisper of Rains"). On 26 February 2013 Kurasov released one more hit single "Zabudesh" ("You'll Forget") that was successfully played on Ukrainian radio stations, as well as in Germany and US stations, and other countries. On 18 June 2013 Kurasov released a music video for the song, filmed by renowned Ukrainian director and screenwriter Maxim Litvinov.

Vladislav Kurasov became  a semifinalist of the international music competition Unsigned Only in 2013 held in Nashville, Tennessee in Teen category with his version of "Hallelujah" from Leonard Cohen.

On 13 September 2013 Kurasov presented his single "Day Mne Ispit" self-written and composed and a music video following on 8 October 2013  It became "The People's Voice" Winner at the 2013 International Songwriting Competitions, and got an Honorable mention in the Teen category. On 20 June 2014 it was selected for the Al Walser Top 20 Countdown Show. 
even though the song was in Russian.

"Day Mne Ispit" was followed on 7 April 2014 by the song "Ya Bolen Toboy" ("I'm Sick of You) again self-written and composed by Kurasov. With photographer Marina Khadzhinova, he produced a music video for his song that debuted on 18 September 2014 in a presentation in the Kyiv complex Indigo It was released by Moon Records 

Another success in an international music competition in USA was when Kurasov won "Fandemonium" with the song "Hallelujah" in the "Vocal Performance" category in the 2014 Unsigned Only Music Competition. The competition attracted nearly 8000 entries from over 100 countries.

Kurasov performed has performed at numerous concerts including a successful acoustic concert with Zhenya Khmara on 29 November 2014 in Kyiv with part of proceeds going to charity.

Kurasov new single "My Love" also written by Kurasov was released on Moon Records and ITunes on 24 February 2015. Vladislav was an invitational guest in a Premier Russian Radio in Los Angeles.

On 22 January 2016 a video for his song "Na Glubine Dushi" was released. On 26 January 2016 Ukrainian TV Channels National Television Company of Ukraine (NTU) and STB announced that he was among the participants of that year's Ukrainian National selection of famous and talented Ukrainian singers for Eurovision 2016.

In October 2016 he released a single "Ne Smeysia Sudbe v Litso" that became a lead single of his first music album and music video with the famous music director Taras Golubkov and production of Icona Production at the StarPro music channel. On 25 November 2016 Vladislav Kurasov first album "Otrazhenie" was released on ITunes and GooglePlay.

Singles

Discography 
 * 25 November 2016— Otrazhenie

Videos

Solo Concerts

Guest appearances

Awards and nominations

 2011 Finalist of the TV Show The X-Factor-2 Ukraine,  
 2012 The Winner of the TV Show "Star Ring" 
 2013 Ukraine "Favorite of Success" Award Gold Winner in a Young Talent category 
 2013 International Songwriting Competitions  "The People's Voice" Winner and the Honorable mention in the category Teen with his single "Day Mne Ispit" on 6 May 2014.
 2014 Unsigned Only Music Competition Fandemonium Winner with the song "Hallelujah" (Leonard Cohen cover), Finalist in the "Vocal Performance" category  
 2015 Beat100 #1 Charting Video  Award for "Ya Bolen Toboy" Original Video for the week of 16 February 2015 (won)
 2015 Beat100   Gold Song A&R Award, Gold Video A&R Award &  Silver Most Watched Video Award  for "Ya Bolen Toboy" Original Video 
 2015 Beat100 Audio Chart #1 Award from the week of 29 May 2015 for song "Po Luzham" (won)
 2016 the semifinalist of the Ukrainian National Selection for Eurovision Song Contest -2016

See also 

 X-Factor (Ukraine)
Ukraine in the Eurovision Song Contest 2016

References

External links 

 
 Argumenty i Fakty
 Fakty i Kommentarii
  
 Komsomolskaya Pravda in Ukraine
 
 

1995 births
Living people
Ukrainian television personalities
The X Factor contestants
The Voice (franchise) contestants
21st-century Ukrainian male  singers